"You Will Have to Pay" is a 1945 song by Tex Ritter. "You Will Have To Pay" was Tex Ritter's final number one on Juke Box Folk chart, remaining at the top of the chart for three weeks.  The B-side of the song, "Christmas Carols By the Old Corral", hit number two on the same chart.

References

1945 songs
1945 singles
Tex Ritter songs
Capitol Records singles